Micrelephas mesodonta is a moth in the family Crambidae. It was described by Zeller in 1877. It is found in Bolivia and Peru.

References

Moths described in 1877
Moths of South America